Nicole Begg (née Sykes; born 15 December 1991 in Sydney) is an Australian footballer, who last played for Canberra United in the Australian W-League.

Personal life
In March 2014, she married Mick Begg.

References

1991 births
Living people
Australian women's soccer players
Canberra United FC players
A-League Women players
Women's association football defenders
Damallsvenskan players
Kristianstads DFF players